Samuel Baldwin (or similar) may refer to:

Samuel Baldwyn (1618–1683), English lawyer and politician
Samuel Baldwin (New York politician), in 50th New York State Legislature
Samuel Baldwin (magician), (1848–1924), American magician known as "The White Mahatma"

See also
Sam Baldwin (disambiguation)